NA-238 Karachi East-III is a constituency for the National Assembly of Pakistan.

Area
The constituency primarily consists of Faisal Cantonment, Defence View, Kashmir Colony, Akhtar Colony, Manzoor Colony, Azam Basti, Chanesar Goth, Mehmoodabad, Baloch Colony, Dhoraji Colony, Ferozabad, Hill Park, Muhammad Ali Society, Naval Colony, Karsaz, KDA Scheme, Gulistan-e-Johar and Pehlwan Goth.

Members of Parliament

2018-2023: NA-244 Karachi East-III

Election 2002 

General elections were held on 10 Oct 2002. Syeed Safwanullah of Muttahida Qaumi Movement won by 23,856 votes.

Election 2008 

General elections were held on 18 Feb 2008. Waseem Akhtar of Muttahida Qaumi Movement won by 83,537 votes.

Election 2013 

General elections were held on 11 May 2013. Syed Ali Raza Abidi of Muttahida Qaumi Movement won by 81,603 votes and became the member of National Assembly.

Election 2018 

General elections were held on 25 July 2018.

By-election 2023 
A by-election will be held on 16 March 2023 due to the resignation of Ali Haider Zaidi, the previous MNA from this seat.

See also
NA-237 Karachi East-II
NA-239 Karachi East-IV

References

External links 
Election result's official website

NA-251
Karachi